Electoral district of Leichhardt may refer to:

 Division of Leichhardt, an electorate of the Australian House of Representatives, based in far north Queensland
 Electoral district of Leichhardt (New South Wales), a former electorate of the New South Wales Legislative Assembly based in inner west Sydney
 Electoral district of Leichhardt (Queensland), a former electorate of the Queensland Legislative Assembly, based in central Queensland
 Electoral district of Leichhardt, Queensland (New South Wales), a former electorate of the New South Wales Legislative Assembly, based in central Queensland, prior to Queensland becoming a separate colony in December 1859

See also
 Electoral district of United Pastoral Districts of Moreton, Wide Bay, Burnett, Maranoa, Leichhardt and Port Curtis